Vlahović  is a village in central Croatia, in the municipality of Glina, Sisak-Moslavina County.

Demographics
According to the 2011 census, the village of Vlahović had 73 inhabitants. This represents 25.35% of its pre-war population according to the 1991 census.

The 1991 census recorded that 99.31% of the village population were ethnic Serbs (286/288), and 0.69% were Yugoslavs (2/288).

Notable natives and residents
 Vasilj Gaćeša (1906–1942) - antifascist, partisan and People's Hero of Yugoslavia
 Nikola Demonja (1919–1944) - antifascist, partisan and People's Hero of Yugoslavia

References

Populated places in Sisak-Moslavina County
Serb communities in Croatia
Glina, Croatia